Brian Johnston  was a British cricketer and broadcaster.

Brian Johnston may also refer to:
Brian Johnston (literary researcher) (1932–2013), British literary researcher
Brian Johnston (rugby league) (born 1958), Australian rugby league player
Brian Johnston (linebacker) (born 1986), American football player 
Brian Johnston (center) (born 1962), American football player
Brian Johnston (fighter) (born 1968), American mixed martial artist
Brian Johnston (field hockey) (1933–1998), New Zealand field hockey player

See also
Brian Johnson (disambiguation)